The NWA World Brass Knuckles Championship was a short-lived title promoted by National Wrestling Alliance NWA Mid-America territory from 1978 until 1981. The championship was used in specialty matches in which the combatants would wear brass knuckles. There were other such championships used in a number of NWA territories throughout the United States of America, including versions in the Florida territory, Amarillo, New England, the Mid-Atlantic region and in NWA Tri-State. Because the championship was a professional wrestling championship, it was not won or lost competitively but instead by the decision of the bookers of a wrestling promotion. The championship was awarded after the chosen wrestler "won" a match to maintain the illusion that professional wrestling is a competitive sport.

Title history
Key

See also
National Wrestling Alliance
NWA Brass Knuckles Championship (Florida version)
NWA Brass Knuckles Championship (Amarillo version)
NWA Brass Knuckles Championship (New England version)
NWA Brass Knuckles Championship (Dallas version)
NWA Brass Knuckles Championship (Mid-Atlantic version)
NWA Brass Knuckles Championship (Tri-State version)

Footnotes

References
General

Specific

National Wrestling Alliance championships
NWA Mid-America championships
Hardcore wrestling championships
1978 establishments in Tennessee
1982 disestablishments in Tennessee